Vaadamalli is a 2011 Indian Malayalam thriller film directed by Alberrt Antoni after his critically acclaimed debut film Kanne Madanguka. 

The film featuring some fresh faces in the lead was shot at various locations in Kochi, Alappuzha, Munnar, Athirapally and Thrissur.

Vaadamalli was produced by Sunil Chandrika Nair under the banner of Zoe Estebe Moviez.

Plot

The title symbolizes everlasting love and is set in the backdrop of a music college. It tells the story of a student named Vasu (Rahul Madhav), who hails from a slum. The people in the slum sponsor his education. Vrindha Nambiar (Richa Panai) comes from a rich family and she falls in love with Vasu. Newcomers Ramesh Raveendran, Niji Mary, Pradeep Chandran and Jyothi Chatterji also play important roles in the film. The story takes a dramatic turn when a girl goes missing from the college hostel. The clues to her whereabouts emerge when various students narrate their versions of the events. The Police officer (Pradeep Chandran) find that a girl took obscene pictures of Vrinda.

Cast
 Rahul Madhav as Vasu 
 Pradeep Chandran as Brother/Police Officer
 Ramesh Raveendran as Sandesh
 Richa Panai as Vrindha Nambiar 
 Niji Mary
 Jyothi Chatterji
 Bijukuttan
 Raveendran 
 Lintu Thomas as Vrindha's friend

Soundtrack

The songs of this movie were composed by Shyam Balakrishnan, with lyrics by Vayalar Sarath Chandra Varma.

Release 
Rediff gave the film one out of five stars and wrote that "On the whole, Vaadamalli is, to put it mildly, inane".

References

External links 

2010s Malayalam-language films
2010s thriller films
Films shot in Munnar
Films shot in Thrissur
Films shot in Alappuzha